Jacek Tadeusz Morajko (born 26 April 1981) is a Polish former road racing cyclist, who rode professionally between 2003 and 2018 for the , , , ,  (two spells) and  teams. He now works as a directeur sportif for UCI Continental team .

Born in Opole, Morajko made his professional debut in 2003 for the team . In 2007, he was finished second at the Polish National Road Race Championships. Three years later, he won the road race and also two stages and the general classification of the Course de la Solidarité Olympique and the Tour of Małopolska. In 2011, he won the Coupe des Carpathes.

In 2008, he finished 54th at the road race of the 2008 Summer Olympics in Beijing.

Major results

2002
 2nd Grand Prix Cristal Energie
 9th GP Ostrowca Swietokrzyskiego
2003
 3rd Wielkanocny Wyścig o Puchar Wójta Gminy Kłomnice
2004
 4th GP Ciudad de Vigo
2006
 1st GP Area Metropolitana de Vigo
 3rd GP Ciudad de Vigo
2007
 2nd Road race, National Road Championships
 4th Overall Beijing 2008 Test Event
2008
 1st Puchar Wojta Gminy Chrzastowice
 6th Overall Tour of Hainan
2009
 2nd Overall Tour of Małopolska
 2nd Coupe des Carpathes
 5th Overall Tour de Slovaquie
 6th Rund um die Nürnberger Altstadt
 9th Overall Szlakiem Grodów Piastowskich
1st Stage 2
 10th Overall Course de la Solidarité Olympique
2010
 1st  Road race, National Road Championships
 1st  Overall Tour of Małopolska
 1st  Overall Course de la Solidarité Olympique
1st Stages 4 & 5
 3rd Coupe des Carpathes
2011
 1st Coupe des Carpathes
2013
 3rd Coupe des Carpathes
 5th Overall Tour of Małopolska
2014
 1st Stage 5 Course de la Solidarité Olympique
 1st Stage 3a (TTT) Sibiu Cycling Tour
 1st Stage 1 (TTT) Dookoła Mazowsza
2015
 7th Coupe des Carpathes
2016
 2nd Race Horizon Park for Peace
2017
 1st  Mountains classification East Bohemia Tour
 4th Coupe des Carpathes
 5th Korona Kocich Gór
 6th Race Horizon Park for Peace

References

External links

Cyclists at the 2008 Summer Olympics
Polish male cyclists
Olympic cyclists of Poland
1981 births
Living people
Sportspeople from Opole
Directeur sportifs